Doły  is a settlement in the administrative district of Gmina Sztutowo, within Nowy Dwór Gdański County, Pomeranian Voivodeship, in northern Poland.

For the history of the region, see History of Pomerania.

References

Villages in Nowy Dwór Gdański County